Brignole is a metro station on the line 1 at Genoa that opened in 2012. Connections:Genova Brignole railway station. The architect is Renzo Piano.

References

External links

Genoa Metro stations
Railway stations opened in 2012
2012 establishments in Italy
Renzo Piano buildings
Railway stations in Italy opened in the 21st century